WHET (97.7 FM) is a radio station broadcasting a classic country format. Licensed to West Frankfort, Illinois, United States, the station serves the Marion-Carbondale area. The station is owned by Withers Broadcasting and the broadcast license held by Withers Broadcasting of Southern Illinois, LLC. WHET features programming from Westwood One.

History

The station was assigned call sign WFRX-FM on July 24, 1979. On October 1, 1996, the station changed its call sign to WQUL and on August 18, 2009, to the current WHET.

On March 9, 2011, WHET changed their format to classic country, branded as "US 97.7".

References

External links

HET
Country radio stations in the United States